Polanisia is a genus of flowering plants in the family Cleomaceae. Members of the genus are commonly known as clammyweeds. Polanisia jamesii is listed as locally endangered in Minnesota, while P. dodecandra is widespread through much of North America.

Species
Five species are currently recognized in the genus:

Polanisia dodecandra (L.) DC. – redwhisker clammyweed
Polanisia dodecandra subsp. dodecandra
Polanisia dodecandra subsp. riograndensis H.H.Iltis
Polanisia dodecandra subsp. trachysperma (Torr. & A.Gray) H.H.Iltis
Polanisia erosa (Nutt.) H.H.Iltis – large clammyweed	 
Polanisia jamesii (Torr. & A.Gray) H.H.Iltis – James' clammyweed	 
Polanisia tenuifolia Torr. & A.Gray – slenderleaf clammyweed
Polanisia uniglandulosa (Cav.) DC. – Mexican clammyweed

Formerly placed here
Arivela viscosa (L.) Raf. (as P. viscosa (L.) DC.)

References

External links

Cleomaceae
Brassicales genera
Taxa named by Constantine Samuel Rafinesque